Prison social hierarchy refers to the social status of prisoners within a correctional facility, and how that status is used to exert power over other inmates. A prisoner's place in the hierarchy is determined by a wide array of factors including previous crimes, access to contraband, affiliation with prison gangs, and physical or sexual domination of other prisoners. Sex offenders & Child murderers are low in the hierarchy and are often the victims of extreme violence in prisons. They are, among the inmates of a prison, considered intolerable. Sacha Darke has studied the social hierarchies that have developed in the 16 police carceragens (holding-cells) in Rio de Janeiro.

References 

Penology